Macao Beach, or Playa Macao, is a public beach located in the province La Altagracia in the east region of the Dominican Republic. It is popular among locals and visitors for its white sands, clear waters and those who seek some adventure since this is a popular destiny for buggy and four wheels riders and surfers. This is one of the only beaches of the Dominican Republic apt for surfing.

Macao Beach has a Certificate of Excellence in TripAdvisors and is highly rated by this community. Macao Beach is one of the only beaches in the area not directly surrounded by hotels.

Climate 
Macao Beach like its surroundings in the Dominican Republic and the Caribbean as a whole, has warm average temperatures. The table below contains the average temperatures per year of this beach.

See also
Punta Cana

References 

Beaches of the Dominican Republic